The 2017–18 UEFA Champions League was the 63rd season of Europe's premier club football tournament organised by UEFA, and the 26th season since it was renamed from the European Champion Clubs' Cup to the UEFA Champions League.

The final was played between Real Madrid F.C. and Liverpool at the NSC Olimpiyskiy Stadium in Kyiv, Ukraine. Real Madrid F.C. beat Liverpool 3–1 to win a record-extending 13th title, their third title in a row and fourth in five seasons.

As winners, Real Madrid qualified as the UEFA representative for the 2018 FIFA Club World Cup in the United Arab Emirates, and also earned the right to play against the winners of the 2017–18 UEFA Europa League, Atlético Madrid, in the 2018 UEFA Super Cup, winning the former and losing the latter. Additionally, they would have been automatically qualified for the 2018–19 UEFA Champions League group stage, but since they had already qualified through their league performance, the berth reserved was given to the champions of the 2017–18 Czech First League, the 11th-ranked association according to the 2018–19 access list.

Association team allocation
79 teams from 54 of the 55 UEFA member associations participated (the exception being Liechtenstein, which did not organise a domestic league). The association ranking based on the UEFA country coefficients was used to determine the number of participating teams for each association:
Associations 1–3 each had four teams qualify.
Associations 4–6 each had three teams qualify.
Associations 7–15 each had two teams qualify.
Associations 16–55 (except Liechtenstein) each had one team qualify.
The winners of the 2016–17 UEFA Champions League and 2016–17 UEFA Europa League were each given an additional entry if they did not qualify for the 2017–18 UEFA Champions League through their domestic league. Because a maximum of five teams from one association could enter the Champions League, if both the Champions League title holders and the Europa League title holders were from the same top three ranked association and finished outside the top four of their domestic league, the fourth-placed team of their association was moved to the Europa League. For this season:
The winners of the 2016–17 UEFA Champions League, Real Madrid, qualified through their domestic league, meaning the additional entry for the Champions League title holders was not necessary.
The winners of the 2016–17 UEFA Europa League, Manchester United, did not qualify through their domestic league, meaning the additional entry for the Europa League title holders was necessary.

Kosovo, who became a UEFA member on 3 May 2016, made their debut in the UEFA Champions League.

Association ranking
For the 2017–18 UEFA Champions League, the associations were allocated places according to their 2016 UEFA country coefficients, which took into account their performance in European competitions from 2011–12 to 2015–16.

Apart from the allocation based on the country coefficients, associations could have additional teams participating in the Champions League, as noted below:
 – Additional berth for UEFA Europa League title holders

Distribution
In the default access list, the Champions League title holders entered the group stage. However, since Real Madrid already qualified for the group stage (as the champions of the 2016–17 La Liga), the Champions League title holders berth in the group stage was given to the Europa League title holders, Manchester United.

Teams
League positions of the previous season qualified via league position shown in parentheses. Manchester United qualified as Europa League title holders. (TH: Champions League title holders; EL: Europa League title holders).

Notes

Round and draw dates
The schedule of the competition was as follows (all draws were held at the UEFA headquarters in Nyon, Switzerland, unless stated otherwise).

Qualifying rounds

In the qualifying rounds and the play-off round, teams were divided into seeded and unseeded teams based on their 2017 UEFA club coefficients, and then drawn into two-legged home-and-away ties. Teams from the same association could not be drawn against each other.

First qualifying round

Second qualifying round

Third qualifying round
The third qualifying round was split into two separate sections: Champions Route (for league champions) and League Route (for league non-champions). The losing teams in both sections entered the 2017–18 UEFA Europa League play-off round.

Play-off round

The play-off round was split into two separate sections: Champions Route (for league champions) and League Route (for league non-champions). The losing teams in both sections entered the 2017–18 UEFA Europa League group stage.

Group stage

The draw for the group stage was held on 24 August 2017, 18:00 CEST, at the Grimaldi Forum in Monaco. The 32 teams were drawn into eight groups of four, with the restriction that teams from the same association could not be drawn against each other. For the draw, the teams were seeded into four pots based on the following principles (introduced starting 2015–16 season):
Pot 1 contained the title holders and the champions of the top seven associations based on their 2016 UEFA country coefficients. As the title holders, Real Madrid, were one of the champions of the top seven associations, the champions of the association ranked eighth (Ukraine's Shakhtar Donetsk) were also seeded into Pot 1 (regulations Article 13.05).

Pot 2, 3 and 4 contained the remaining teams, seeded based on their 2017 UEFA club coefficients.

In each group, teams played against each other home-and-away in a round-robin format. The group winners and runners-up advanced to the round of 16, while the third-placed teams entered the 2017–18 UEFA Europa League round of 32. The matchdays were 12–13 September, 26–27 September, 17–18 October, 31 October – 1 November, 21–22 November, and 5–6 December 2017.

The youth teams of the clubs that qualified for the group stage also participated in the 2017–18 UEFA Youth League on the same matchdays, where they competed in the UEFA Champions League Path (the youth domestic champions of the top 32 associations competed in a separate Domestic Champions Path until the play-offs).

Seventeen national associations were represented in the group stage. Qarabağ and RB Leipzig made their debut appearances in the group stage. Qarabağ were the first team from Azerbaijan to play in the Champions League group stage. For the first time since the 1997–98 edition, England's Arsenal did not qualify for the group stage. Qarabag, Basel, Anderlecht, Spartak Moscow, Maribor, Feyenoord and APOEL made their as of 2022-23 final appereances in the Champions League.

Group A

Group B

Group C

Group D

Group E

Group F

Group G

Group H

Knockout phase

In the knockout phase, teams played against each other over two legs on a home-and-away basis, except for the one-match final. The mechanism of the draws for each round was as follows:
In the draw for the round of 16, the eight group winners were seeded, and the eight group runners-up were unseeded. The seeded teams were drawn against the unseeded teams, with the seeded teams hosting the second leg. Teams from the same group or the same association could not be drawn against each other.
In the draws for the quarter-finals onwards, there were no seedings, and teams from the same group or the same association could be drawn against each other.

Bracket

Round of 16

Quarter-finals

Semi-finals

Final

Statistics
Statistics exclude qualifying rounds and play-off round.

Top goalscorers

Top assists

Squad of the season
The UEFA technical study group selected the following 18 players as the squad of the tournament.

Players of the season

Votes were cast for players of the season by coaches of the 32 teams in the group stage, together with 55 journalists selected by the European Sports Media (ESM) group, representing each of UEFA's member associations. The coaches were not allowed to vote for players from their own teams. Jury members selected their top three players, with the first receiving five points, the second three and the third one. The shortlist of the top three players were announced on 9 August 2018. The award winners were announced and presented during the 2018–19 UEFA Champions League group stage draw in Monaco on 30 August 2018.

Goalkeeper of the season

Defender of the season

Midfielder of the season

Forward of the season

See also
2017–18 UEFA Europa League
2018 UEFA Super Cup
2018 FIFA Club World Cup
2017–18 UEFA Women's Champions League
2017–18 UEFA Youth League

References

External links

UEFA Champions League (official website)
UEFA Champions League history: 2017/18

 
1
2017-18